The siege of Philippopolis was fought in about 250 between Rome and the Goths during the invasions of 249–253 at the Thracian city of Philippopolis, modern Plovdiv, Bulgaria. It was part of the long-running series of Gothic Wars.

The Goths were led by King Cniva who had crossed the Danube in 249 or 250 with two armies. His army attacked Novae and Nicopolis ad Istrum unsuccessfully before defeating the army of Emperor Decius at Augusta Traiana and moving on to Philippopolis.

Decius had been on his way to relieve Philippopolis with a reinforced army, but arrived too late.

After a long siege, Cniva was victorious after the city was betrayed by a citizen. The king subsequently allied himself with the governor of Thrace, Titus Julius Priscus, to take on the Roman Emperor Decius again at Abritus.

References

External links
 Book excerpt

Philippopolis 250
Crisis of the Third Century
Philippopolis
Philippopolis
Military history of Bulgaria
History of Plovdiv
Roman Thrace
250
250s in the Roman Empire